Louis-Marie-Joseph Maximilian Caffarelli du Falga (February 13, 1756 – 27 April 1799) was a French commander and scholar. His younger brothers Marie-François Auguste de Caffarelli du Falga (1766–1849) and Louis-Marie Joseph Caffarelli (1760–1845) were also generals.

Life
The oldest of ten children, he refused to exercise the right of the first-born son to the majority of his parents' wealth. He served under Jean Baptiste Kléber in the army of Sambre-et-Meuse, losing his left leg to a cannonball on December 17, 1795, but continuing in the army with a wooden leg, and joined Kléber on the Egyptian campaign.

Accompanying Napoleon on the French invasion of Egypt, he was present when Napoleon landed at Valletta to occupy Malta on 12 June 1798. Like the other French generals, he was impressed by its defences, saying to Napoleon, "Upon my word, General, it is lucky there is someone in the town to open the gates for us!" A saying arose about him among the expeditionary troops in France: "Caffa doesn't give a damn what happens; he's always sure to have one foot in France." He was elected a member of the Institut d'Égypte's political economy section on February 13, 1796, in the class of moral and political science, and formed part of the commission for drafting the Institute's regulations. He also accompanied Napoleon on the surveys to trace the route of what later become the Suez Canal.

He then had to have his right arm amputated when his elbow was smashed by a bullet during a new assault on Acre on April 9, 1799. He was just starting to learn to write with his left hand when gangrene struck, causing a fever that killed him. Napoleon wrote of him in the order of the day: "Our universal regrets accompany General Caffarelli to the grave; the army is losing one of its bravest leaders, Egypt one of its legislators, France one of its best citizens, and science, an illustrious scholar." He is the hero of Youssef Chahine's film Adieu Bonaparte.

External links 
Life of Napoleon, Chapter 13
A New General Biographical Dictionary, p386
A History of the Egyptian Revolution

1756 births
1799 deaths
People from Haute-Garonne
French people of Italian descent
French Republican military leaders killed in the French Revolutionary Wars
French amputees
Names inscribed under the Arc de Triomphe